{|
{{Infobox ship image
|Ship image=
|Ship caption=USS Mahopac in 1921
}}

|}

USS Mahopac (ATA-29) was a United States Navy fleet tug launched in 1919.  She was a Bagaduce-class ship, a class of 19 steel tugs begun in 1918 which preceded the Navajo-class (later renamed the Cherokee).

The Bagaduce-class tugs were designed to serve as minesweepers and conduct heavy-duty towing work at navy yards.  Mahopac'' was decommissioned in 1947.

It was one of three vessels of that name in the U.S. Navy to date, after the town of Lake Mahopac, New York.

References

Bagaduce-class fleet tugs
1919 ships